Dido building Carthage, or The Rise of the Carthaginian Empire is an oil on canvas painting by J. M. W. Turner.  The painting is one of Turner's most important works, greatly influenced by the luminous classical landscapes of Claude Lorrain.  Turner described it as his chef d'oeuvre.  First exhibited at the Royal Academy summer exhibition in 1815, Turner kept the painting until he left it to the nation in the Turner Bequest.  It has been held by the National Gallery in London since 1856.  

The subject is a classical landscape taken from Virgil's Aeneid.  The figure in blue and white on the left is Dido, directing the builders of the new city of Carthage.  The figure in front of her, wearing armour and facing away from the viewer, may be her Trojan lover Aeneas.  Some children are playing with a flimsy toy boat in the water, symbolising the growing but fragile naval power of Carthage, while the tomb of her dead husband Sychaeus, on the right side of the painting, on the other bank of the estuary, foreshadows the eventual doom of Carthage.  

The eruption of Mount Tambora in April 1815 created magnificent sunrises and sunsets which may have inspired Turner's paintings in this period. The painting was widely admired when it was first exhibited at the Royal Academy summer exhibition in 1815 together Crossing the Brook, a pastoral landscape of the River Tamar in Devon also inspired by Claude Lorrain. However, Turner's work was criticised by Sir George Beaumont, who complained that it was "painted in false taste, not true to nature" and did not reach the heights of Claude Lorrain's works. Turner exhibited a companion piece, The Decline of the Carthaginian Empire, at the summer exhibition in 1817.

In the first draft of his first will in 1829, Turner stipulated that he should be buried in the canvas of Dido building Carthage, but changed his mind to make a donation of the painting and The Decline of the Carthaginian Empire to the National Gallery, on condition that his two paintings should always be hung either side of Claude Lorrain's Seaport with the Embarkation of the Queen of Sheba, a painting that Turner first saw when it was part of the Angerstein collection which later became the nucleus for the National Gallery.  His revised will of 1831 changed the bequest, so Dido building Carthage would be accompanied by Sun rising through Vapour, and the two works would be exhibited alongside Seaport with the Embarkation of the Queen of Sheba and Landscape with the Marriage of Isaac and Rebecca (also known as The Mill).  A codicil in 1848 donated the remainder of his completed works to the new National Gallery in Trafalgar Square, so they could be displayed together.  The Turner Bequest was contested by his relatives, but resolved by 1856 when the works were acquired by the National Gallery.  Most of Turner's works eventually moved to the Tate Gallery in the early 20th century, but Dido building Carthage and Sun rising through Vapour remain at the National Gallery, shown with the Claudes; a few other selected works by Turner, including Rain, Steam and Speed and The Fighting Temeraire remain as examples of English painting at the National Gallery.

References
 National Gallery
 JMW Turner, the English Claude, The Guardian, 8 March 2012
 J. M. W. Turner: The Making of a Modern Artist, Sam Smiles, pp. 42–44, 126–128
 Academies, Museums, and Canons of Art, Gillian Perry, Colin Cunningham, pp. 183–185
 Angel in the Sun: Turner's Vision of History, Gerald E. Finley, pp. 63–67
 Cultivating Picturacy: Visual Art And Verbal Interventions, James A. W. Heffernan, pp. 129–131
 Turner biography, Turner Society

1815 paintings
Collections of the National Gallery, London
Paintings by J. M. W. Turner
Water in art
Sun in art
Paintings based on the Aeneid
Cultural depictions of Dido